1st Congress may refer to:

Countries
1st Congress of the Philippines (1946–1949)
1st Congress of the Commonwealth of the Philippines (1945–1946)
1st National People's Congress (1954–1959)
1st United States Congress (1789–1791)
First Continental Congress (1774)

Parties
1st Congress of the Indonesian Democratic Party (1976)
1st Congress of the National Christian Party (1945)
1st Congress of the Russian Social Democratic Labour Party (1898)
1st Congress of the Workers' Party of North Korea (1946)
1st National Congress of the Chinese Communist Party (1921)
1st National Congress of the Kuomintang (1924)
1st National Congress of the Lao People's Party (1955)
1st Otan Founding Congress (1999)

Internationals
1st Congress of the Comintern (1919)
First International Syndicalist Congress (1913)
Geneva Congress (1866), the 1st Congress of the First International
International Workers Congresses of Paris, 1889, the 1st Congress of the Second International